Murat Duruer (born 15 January 1988) is a Turkish professional footballer who most recently played for Turkish TFF First League club İstanbulspor. He plays as a left winger.

Murat Duruer earned his first cap for Turkey on 5 March 2014, in a friendly match against Sweden.

References

External links
 
 
 Soccerway Profile

1988 births
Living people
People from Gerede
Turkish footballers
Turkey B international footballers
Turkey under-21 international footballers
MKE Ankaragücü footballers
Gençlerbirliği S.K. footballers
Kayserispor footballers
Antalyaspor footballers
Çaykur Rizespor footballers
Adana Demirspor footballers
İstanbulspor footballers
Süper Lig players
TFF First League players
Turkish twins
Twin sportspeople
Turkey youth international footballers
Turkey international footballers

Association football midfielders